The Tree, the Mayor and the Mediatheque (known also as Les sept hasards) is a 1993 French comedy-drama film written and directed by Éric Rohmer. The film was shown at the 1993 Montreal World Film Festival where it received the FIPRESCI prize. 

The frame story involves the mayor of an isolated French village who, to further his political ambitions, secures a grant to build a sporting and cultural centre, but the necessary felling of a fine willow outrages the schoolteacher and his daughter. Within the frame there is much debate about the current state of France: city versus country, agriculture versus industry, conservatism versus progress, the environment versus growth.

Plot
In Saint-Juire-Champgillon, a remote village of traditional left-wing adherence in the Vendée, Julien Dechaumes has inherited the manor house and grounds and has been elected mayor, though he spends much of his time in Paris with his mistress. There he successfully lobbies the Ministry of Culture for a grant to build a state-of-the-art sports and media centre. By enhancing his reputation in the area, it will boost his chances of entering national politics under the socialist banner. 

Opinion in the village is mixed, with the most passionate opposition coming from the schoolteacher, for whom the destruction of a 100-year-old willow symbolises all that is wrong about the plan. When a journalist on a left-wing magazine visits the village to talk to people, her editor cuts her piece to focus on the teacher and the tree. The teacher's ten-year-old daughter explains to the mayor that all the children want is not the sophisticated facilities on offer but just green space and trees. A survey reveals that the water table has dropped alarmingly, needing costly groundworks that make the whole project unviable.

Cast
 Pascal Greggory as Julien Dechaumes, the mayor
 Arielle Dombasle as Bérénice Beaurivage, the mayor's lover
 Fabrice Luchini as Marc Rossignol, the school teacher
  as Blandine Lenoir, the reporter
 François-Marie Banier as Régis Lebrun-Blondet, the magazine editor

External links
 
 
 

1993 films
1993 comedy-drama films
1990s French-language films
Films about politicians
Films directed by Éric Rohmer
Films set in Paris
Films shot in Paris
French comedy-drama films
1990s French films